= List of Oceanian countries by population growth rate =

The list is based on CIA World Factbook estimates. Countries or dependent territories without a 2017 estimate are omitted.

== List ==
CIA World Factbook (2017)

Rank	Country	Annual growth (%)
1	Solomon Islands	1.94
2	Vanuatu	1.85
3	Papua New Guinea	1.71
4	Marshall Islands	1.55
5	New Caledonia	1.33
6	Kiribati	1.13
7	Australia	1.03
8	French Polynesia	0.88
9	Tuvalu	0.85
10	New Zealand	0.79
11	Fiji	0.60
11	Samoa	0.60
13	Nauru	0.53
14	Palau	0.39
15	Wallis and Futuna	0.32
16	Guam	0.26
17	Tonga	-0.05
18	Northern Mariana Islands	-0.51
19	Federated States of Micronesia	-0.52
20	American Samoa	-1.30
21	Cook Islands	-2.79
